Gen Nakagawa, of his full name   is the mayor of Nara in Kansai, Japan. On 10 July 2017, he was elected to his third term as mayor. He is politically independent. Nakagawa supports investing more in child care.

References

Japanese politicians
Living people
Year of birth missing (living people)